Iolaus creta, the blotched sapphire, is a butterfly in the family Lycaenidae. It is found in Nigeria (the Cross River loop), Cameroon, Gabon, the Republic of the Congo, the Democratic Republic of the Congo (Tshopo and Kivu) and Uganda (western Bwamba). The habitat consists of forests.

References

External links

Die Gross-Schmetterlinge der Erde 13: Die Afrikanischen Tagfalter. Plate XIII 68 f

Butterflies described in 1878
Iolaus (butterfly)
Butterflies of Africa
Taxa named by William Chapman Hewitson